The Football competitions in the 2001 Summer Universiade were held in Beijing, China.

Medalists

References
World Student Games (Universiade – Men). GBR Athletics. Retrieved on 18 February 2010.
World Student Games (Universiade – Women). GBR Athletics. Retrieved on 18 February 2010.

2001 Summer Universiade
Universiade
Football at the Summer Universiade
International association football competitions hosted by South Korea
2001 in South Korean football